Ecnomiohyla veraguensis is a frog that lives in Costa Rica and Panama.  Scientists have seen it at 540 meters above sea level.  It lives in the Talamanca Mountains in Costa Rica and in Santa Fé National Park in Panama.

This frog lives in the forest canopy.

References

Frogs of North America
veraguensis
IUCN Red List vulnerable species
Amphibians described in 2014